Bryant Martin Gammiero is an American soccer player who plays as a goalkeeper.

Career

Semi-professional & Professional
Gammiero played with NPSL side Miami United in 2018. In May 2019, he joined United Premier Soccer League side Florida Soccer Soldiers, featuring for the amateur club in its notable run in the Lamar Hunt US Open Cup, reaching the Third Round with wins over Miami FC and USL Championship's Charlotte Independence.

In September 2020, Gammiero joined Miami FC for their NISA season, making a single appearance. He stayed with the side during their move to the USL Championship in 2020. He made his USL debut on August 16, 2020, earning Miami its first league point in a 1–1 draw against rival Tampa Bay Rowdies.

Career Statistics

Honors
Miami FC
National Independent Soccer Association
East Coast Championship (1): 2019

References

External links
 
 Bryant Martin Gammiero profile on USL Championship
 Bryant Martin Gammiero profile on Miami FC

1993 births
Living people
American soccer players
Association football goalkeepers
Miami FC players
National Premier Soccer League players
USL Championship players
National Independent Soccer Association players
People from Miami
Soccer players from Florida
Sportspeople from the Miami metropolitan area